Neolamprologus ventralis is a species of cichlid endemic to Lake Tanganyika.    This species can reach a length of  TL.  This species can also be found in the aquarium trade.

References

Büscher, H. H., 1995. Ein neuer Cichlide aus dem Tanganjikasee. Neolamprologus ventralis n. sp. (Cichlidae, Lamprologini). D.A.T.Z. 48(6):379–382. (Ref. 93985)

ventralis
Taxa named by Heinz Heinrich Büscher
Fish described in 1995
Fish of Lake Tanganyika